New Writings in SF 2 is an anthology of science fiction short stories edited by John Carnell, the second volume in a series of thirty, of which he edited the first twenty-one. It was first published in hardcover by Dennis Dobson in 1964, followed by a paperback edition under the slightly variant title New Writings in S.F.-2 by Corgi in 1965, and an American paperback edition by Bantam Books in October 1966. Selections from this volume, together with others from volumes 1 and 3-4 of the series, were later included in The Best from New Writings in SF, issued by Dobson in 1971 and Corgi in 1972.

The book collects eight novelettes and short stories by various science fiction authors, with a foreword by Carnell.

Contents
"Foreword" (John Carnell)
"Hell-Planet" (John Rackham)
"The Night-Flame" (Colin Kapp)
"The Creators" (Joseph Green)
"Rogue Leonardo" (G. L. Lack)
"Maiden Voyage" (John Rankine)
"Odd Boy Out" (Dennis Etchison)
"The Eternal Machines" (William Spencer)
"A Round Billiard Table" (Steve Hall)

External links

1964 anthologies
02